Solanum bauerianum is an extinct species in the plant family Solanaceae. It was endemic to Lord Howe Island and Norfolk Island.  Convict artist John Doody painted this species about 1792 and commented that it would be a great acquisition for greenhouses in England.  Ferdinand Bauer collected the type specimen in 1804.  This species was last collected on Norfolk Island in 1830 by Allan Cunningham.

References

bauerianum
Flora of Lord Howe Island
Flora of Norfolk Island
Extinct plants
Plants described in 1833